Ryōko Akamatsu (born 24 August 1929) is a Japanese politician. She was Minister of Education in the Hata Cabinet and Hosokawa Cabinet.

References 

Living people
1929 births
Education ministers of Japan
20th-century Japanese women politicians
20th-century Japanese politicians
People from Osaka Prefecture
Ambassadors of Japan to Uruguay
Women government ministers of Japan